Delaram (also Romanized as Delārām; also known as Delārām-e ‘Olyā and Ţarrārān-e Bālā) is a village in Bazarjan Rural District, in the Central District of Tafresh County, Markazi Province, Iran. At the 2006 census, its population was 68, in 30 families.

Delaram is a summer resort and its main cultivation is walnut. Delaram has an old lush field called dasht (field) which is popular among many urban people who know the area and is used as a strolling area. Remains of a very old mill is buried on the way to the dasht.

The language of the village was in older times a kind of dialect from the Central Iranian languages but it has disappeared some time ago and the current language is standard Persian. Traces of the old dialect are to be found in the speech of some older residents. 
In the past, a large number of Iranian courtiers and courtiers and calligraphers were from the Tafresh and Ashtian regions.

Between the village of Moinabad, to the east of Delaram, and Tafresh lies the Tafresh Azad University.

Migration 
A high percentage of the people of Delaram have migrated to Tehran over time, and many still visit the village during the ceremonies of Ashura for watching the traditional Taziyeh plays.
The focus of Tafreshi migrants to Tehran was at the beginning the neighborhoods around the Mokhtari crossroad with the Shahpour Sreet (Today's Vahdat-e Eslami). The Tafreshian Mosque is still located nearby.

References 

Salnameh-ye Tafresh

Populated places in Tafresh County